Leslie 'Les' Austin Savill (born 30 June 1935) is a former English cricketer.  Savill was a right-handed batsman whose bowling style is unknown.  He was born in Brentwood, Essex.

Savill made his first-class debut for Essex against Glamorgan in the 1953 County Championship.  He played first-class cricket for Essex more from 1953 to 1961, making 125 appearances, with his final appearance coming against Surrey.  In his 125 appearances for the county, he scored 3,919 runs at a batting average of 21.29, with fifteen half centuries, four centuries and a high score of 115.  His highest first-class score came against Cambridge University in 1959.  Savill passed 1,000 runs for a season once, in 1959 when he scored 1,197 runs at an average of 32.35.  His only first-class wicket was George Dews, who he dismissed for 130 when Essex played Worcestershire in 1959.  His only bowling innings, which consisted of 2 overs was expensive, costing 26 runs.

Following the end of his first-class career, he played a single Minor Counties Championship match for Devon in 1964 against Berkshire.

References

External links
Les Savill at ESPNcricinfo
Les Savill at CricketArchive

1935 births
Living people
People from Brentwood, Essex
Sportspeople from Essex
English cricketers
Essex cricketers
Devon cricketers